Plymouth was an early settlement in Mississippi in present-day Lowndes County. It was formed around 1819, developing around the fortified house of John Pitchlynn, the U.S. interpreter for the Choctaw Agency. The low-lying site of the village was prone to repeated flooding. While both Plymouth and its sister town of Columbus across the river had high bluffs, Plymouth's landing site did not have easy access to the bluff heights. By the 1840s, the village site was abandoned, as most of the residents had moved across the river to the better site of Columbus.

Today, the site of Plymouth is just west of John C. Stennis Lock and Dam on the Tennessee-Tombigbee Waterway. A  area was listed on the National Register of Historic Places in 1980. It includes a village site and a cemetery.

It occupies land owned by the Army Corps of Engineers. The complex serves as the local center for ecological studies, as well as a retreat and conference center.

References

Geography of Lowndes County, Mississippi
National Register of Historic Places in Lowndes County, Mississippi
1819 establishments in Mississippi
Populated places on the National Register of Historic Places in Mississippi